Mosaic theory may refer to:
 Mosaic theory (US law), US jurisprudence about piecemeal information gathering
 Mosaic theory (investments), investigative technique used in financial analysis
 Mosaic coevolution, geography and ecology
 Cultural mosaic, theory of multicultural values